James Douglas Hamilton Dickson FRSE MRI (1849–1931) was a Scottish mathematician and expert in electricity. He was a Senior  Fellow at Peterhouse, Cambridge. Glasgow University elected him an Eglinton Fellow. He was the elder brother of Charles Dickson, Lord Dickson.

He had in-depth knowledge in fields of electricity and electrostatics and also a great interest in low temperature physics.

Life

He was born in Glasgow on 1 May 1849, a son of Dr John Robert Dickson of Edinburgh.

He attended both Glasgow and Cambridge Universities, graduating MA. From 1867 to 1869 he was assistant to William Thomson, Lord Kelvin, being the joint-builder of the technical equipment which Kelvin used to measure electrostatic energy. In 1869 he also assisted Kelvin in the laying of the first Transatlantic communication cables. The French company overseeing the work were impressed by Dickson and kept him in their employ as Electrician-in-Charge, based in Brest until 1870.

He then returned to Cambridge to collaborate with W H King and Theophillus Varley in creating more of Lord Kelvin’s machines, including the siphon recorder.
In 1877 he became a Maths Tutor at Peterhouse, his alma mater. In 1907 the college made him a Senior Fellow. He was later made a Governor of the college. He was also a Governor of Huntingdon Grammar School.

He was elected a Fellow of the Royal Society of Edinburgh in 1876. His proposers were Sir James Dewar (his brother-in-law), Peter Guthrie Tait, Alexander Crum Brown, and William Turner.

In the First World War, at which point he was officially retired, he was asked to fill in for absent masters teaching Maths at both Fettes College and Edinburgh Academy.

He died on 6 February 1931.

Publications

Over and above multiple papers on mathematics and physics, Dickson enjoyed biographical work. Three entries in the Dictionary of National Biography are under his authorship:
Peter Guthrie Tait
James Hamblin Smith
Edward John Routh

Other Interests

Dickson could speak Japanese and was very keen on Japanese culture. He had a large collection of swords and tsuba (the ornamental hand guards). On his death these were gifted to the Fitzwilliam Museum in Cambridge and to the Royal Scottish Museum in Edinburgh.

Family

He married Isobel Catherine Banks, sister of his sister-in-law Hestor Bagot Banks (i.e. the two brothers married two sisters). A third sister, Helen Rose Banks, married Sir James Dewar, connecting all three figures.

References

1849 births
1931 deaths
Scottish mathematicians
19th-century Scottish people
Fellows of the Royal Society of Edinburgh
Alumni of the University of Glasgow
Alumni of Peterhouse, Cambridge
19th-century British mathematicians
20th-century British mathematicians
Academics of the University of Cambridge
William Thomson, 1st Baron Kelvin
People associated with electricity
Thermodynamicists